Klasychne derby (Ukrainian: Класичне, as Classico), or the Ukrainian football rivalry is the football match between the two top Ukrainian clubs Dynamo Kyiv and Shakhtar Donetsk. The game between those two clubs is a focal point of each football season in Ukraine. Due to war, at least three of their scheduled fixtures were scratched in 1941 and 2022.

Dynamo and Shakhtar were the top Ukrainian clubs since introduction of the Soviet professional football competitions in 1936. They played against each other since 1938 and the rivalry between them two grew into the Ukrainian national rivalry only sometime after 1996 since the teams were two main contenders for the national title. Some matches between these clubs could be traced as early as 1931 as part of the republican Dynamo sports society competitions when Dynamo Kyiv was playing against the Shakhtar's predecessor Dynamo Stalino.

From 1981 to 1996, a rivalry between Dynamo Kyiv and FC Dnipro was dominant. At that time Dnipro, that returned to the Soviet Top League in 1981, won two Soviet titles in the 1980s and almost became a Ukrainian champion in the 1992–93 season.

During the times of the Soviet Union, the Ukrainian rivalry was overshadowed by the rivalry between Dynamo Kyiv and Spartak Moscow (see Spartak Moscow–Dynamo Kyiv derby) that has developed sometime in the 1960s.

Formation of the derby

Soviet Union

The two clubs first met back in 1938 in Kyiv in the Soviet Top League with Dynamo winning it 2–0. At the time, Dynamo Kyiv was the main representative of Ukraine in the Soviet League, while Shakhtar initially had some difficulties to secure their place there. The Donetsk team, however, was considered to be the main representative of the Ukrainian SSR other than Dynamo, representing the most industrialized and heavily urbanized Donbas region in the eastern part of Ukraine. In a few occasions Shakhtar even managed to place higher than the Dynamo's "Capitals" in League, but for the most of the time Dynamo had more success head-to-head. Their meetings were not as popular in the Soviet League outside of Ukraine as the Moscow – Kyiv face off particularly between Dynamo and Spartak.

Ukraine

The 1990s: Dynamo's dominance
The trend of Dynamo's total dominance continued well after the establishment of the Ukrainian Vyshcha Liha (which eventually became the Ukrainian Premier League). For several seasons Shakhtar was not even among the main contenders for the league title, which was often contested by either FC Dnipro or Chornomorets Odesa. Dynamo won every single league title in the 1990s except one, when SC Tavriya Simferopol managed to pull off an upset, winning the inaugural Ukrainian league season, with Dynamo taking the silver medals, and Shakhtar finishing fourth.

In 1996, Rinat Akhmetov became Shakhtar's president and started investing heavily into the club. Shakhtar became relevant again, placing 2nd in 1996–97, and not finishing below 2nd place in the league ever since. In an interview to Vatsko Live, former Shakhtar player Andriy Vorobey said that at least since 1997 it was cultivated at Shakhtar that Dynamo is not just an opponent, but rather the enemy.

The 2000s: rise of Shakhtar

It was not until the early 2000s when this fixture obtained the status of a true "derby". In the first years of the decade, Dynamo were still riding the wave of their late 1990s success, when they reached the UEFA Champions League quarterfinals and semi-finals in consecutive seasons. After the death of their legendary manager Valeriy Lobanovskiy in 2002, Dynamo's success in the European and Ukrainian competitions began to decline. This coincided with the continued rise of Shakhtar, who won their first Ukrainian league title in 2001–02, which took the rivalry between the two clubs to a whole new level. In the 2008–09 season, the Ukrainian derby was contested in European competition for the first time. Shakhtar defeated Dynamo in a 2008–09 UEFA Cup semi-final and then became the first side in the sovereign Ukraine era to win a European competition.

The 2010s
During the 2015–16 Ukrainian Premier League, on 16 October, Shakhtar Donetsk beat FC Dynamo Kyiv 0–3 in Kyiv and set two new records. One record was that for the first time during a Ukrainian derby game in Kyiv a team scored three goals. The other record was that for the first time Shakhtar had more Ukrainian derby victories, 26, than Dynamo. On 1 May 2016, in the second Premier League match between them at Arena Lviv, Shakhtar won 3–0 again, making it the first time when Dynamo loses two derby matches one after another with a margin of at least 3 goals. Despite all that, Dynamo became the champions that season.

Venues
As of recently, both Dynamo and Shakhtar play at the Olympiyskiy National Sports Complex in Kyiv. Olympiskyi NSC has been one of Dynamo's two home stadiums since 1951 (the other one being the much smaller Valeriy Lobanovskyi Dynamo Stadium). Shakhtar, on the other hand, for the longest time (1938–2001) played at their older Central Stadium "Shakhtar" in Donetsk. In 2008 Shakhtar built new modern stadium Donbas Arena of UEFA elite class, but was forced to leave Donetsk in 2014 due to War in Donbas. Since then, Shakhtar has been based in Kyiv, but until early 2020 played their home matches primarily at Metalist Stadium in Kharkiv.

Statistics

Record of wins
The table shows number of wins for both clubs per competition as well as totals.

 Notes: 
 The Soviet Super Cup was not an official competition. It was organized by an editorial department of the Soviet newspaper Komsomolskaya Pravda.
 While in the Soviet Union the Football Cup of the Ukrainian SSR competitions had official status, since gaining Ukrainian independence the status of the Football Cup of the Ukrainian SSR is not determined by the independent Ukrainian Association of Football (Football Federation of Ukraine).

Titles
Number of titles for both clubs

 Notes: 
 The Soviet Super Cup was not an official competition. It was organized by an editorial department of the Soviet newspaper Komsomolskaya Pravda.
 While in the Soviet Union the Football Cup of the Ukrainian SSR competitions had official status, since gaining Ukrainian independence the status of the Football Cup of the Ukrainian SSR is not determined by the independent Ukrainian Association of Football (Football Federation of Ukraine).

Year-by-year league's standings 

The table lists the place each team took in each of the seasons.

All continental competition games

UEFA Cup/UEFA Europa League

All domestic league games

Soviet League

Notes:
 In Soviet league competitions both teams met 82 times, all in the Soviet Top League.
 41 wins of Dinamo, 15 wins of Shakhter, 26 draws
 128 goals of Dinamo, 79 goals of Shakhter

Ukrainian League

Notes:
 In Ukrainian league competitions both teams met 69 times, all in the Ukrainian Premier League.
 26 wins of Shakhtar, 25 wins of Dynamo, 18 draws

All national cup competition games

Soviet cup

Ukrainian cup

All super cup competition games

Soviet Season's Cup
The match did not have an official status

Ukrainian Super Cup

Note:

All other cup competition games

Championship of the Dynamo All-Ukrainian Proletarian Sports Society

Football cup of the Ukrainian SSR

USSR Football Federation Cup

Top goalscorers
 Players in bold are still active
 In parenthesis are goals scored from penalty kicks
 Included players who scored at least six goals in games between Dynamo–Shakhtar

 Own goals – Mykola Krasyuk (Shakhtar), Abram Lerman (Dynamo), Oleksandr Pollak (Shakhtar), Oleksiy Drozdenko (Shakhtar), Anatoliy Konkov (Dynamo), Dmytro Chyhrynskyi (Shakhtar), Serhiy Fedorov (Dynamo), Goran Gavrančić (Dynamo), Adrian Pukanych (Shakhtar), Yevhen Khacheridi (Dynamo, 2), Davit Khocholava (Shakhtar), Oleksandr Kucher (Shakhtar)
 Hat-tricks – Volodymyr Bohdanovych (Dynamo), Valeriy Yaremchenko (Shakhtar), Ihor Petrov (Shakhtar), Ihor Belanov (Dynamo)
 Both teams – Viktor Fomin, Vitaliy Khmelnytskyi, Oleh Bazylevych, Serhii Rebrov

Crossing the divide

Soviet Union
In bold are players who transferred directly from one club to the other.
Shakhtar then Dynamo
 1934:  Viktor Shylovsky (from Dynamo Stalino to Dynamo Kyiv)
 1953:  Viktor Fomin
 1965:  Vitaliy Khmelnytskyi
 1975:  Anatoliy Konkov
 1976:  Viktor Zvyahintsev
 1982:  Viktor Chanov

Dynamo then Shakhtar
 1967:  Valeriy Lobanovskyi
 1977:  Viktor Zvyahintsev
 1990:  Andriy Kovtun (have not played a single game in Dynamo)

Ukraine
Since Ukrainian independence, there had been only three direct transfer moves in each direction (Dynamo to Shakhtar, Shakhtar to Dynamo). Most of the direct transfers, however, took place in the 1990s, when the rivalry between the clubs was virtually non-existent.

In bold are players who transferred directly from one club to the other.
Shakhtar then Dynamo
 1992:  Serhii Rebrov
 1992:  Andriy Kovtun
 2008:  Emmanuel Okoduwa (have not played a single game for Dynamo)
 2016:  Oleksandr Hladkyi
 2019:  Oleksandr Karavayev (have not played a single game for Shakhtar)

Dynamo then Shakhtar
 1992:  Oleh Matveyev
 1998:  Volodymyr Kovalyuk
 2007:  Volodymyr Yezerskyi
 2011:  Oleksandr Rybka
 2014:  Rustam Khudzhamov (have not played a single game for Dynamo)
 2018:  Oleksiy Shevchenko (have not played a single game for Dynamo)
 2018:  Júnior Moraes

Notes

References

External links 
 FC Shakhtar Donetsk official site
 FC Dynamo Kyiv official site
 Five best goals of Dynamo–Shakhtar games in the newest history (Пять лучших голов матчей Динамо — Шахтер в новейшей истории). Sport Arena. 3 August 2018

Ukrainian football derbies
FC Dynamo Kyiv
FC Shakhtar Donetsk